Wine Museum may refer to:
 Vino Versum Poysdorf, Austria
 Wine Museum (Pleven), Bulgaria
 Wine Museum, Ehnen, Luxembourg
 Wine Museum and Enoteca, Brazil
 Cyprus Wine Museum, Limassol District, Cyprus
 Macau Wine Museum, Macau, SAR China
 Musée du Vin (Wine Museum of Paris), France
 Museo del vino (Torgiano), Italy
 Drăgășani Wine Museum, Romania 
 Yilan Distillery Chia Chi Lan Wine Museum, Taiwan